Raja Sinnathuray was a Sri Lankan politician, having been a former Member of Western Provincial Council from 1988 to 1993.

Family life 
Sinnathuray married Malini, They had two daughters, Sasihikala and Pushpakala.

References

2022 deaths
Sri Lankan Tamil politicians
People from Colombo
People from Western Province, Sri Lanka
Alumni of Wesley College, Colombo
Members of the Western Provincial Council
Provincial councillors of Sri Lanka